Berk Akalın (born January 20, 1995) is a Turkish ice dancer. With his former skating partner, Çağla Demirsal, he is the 2011 Turkish national champion and placed 14th at the 2013 World Junior Championships.

Programs

With Kelly

With Demirsal

Single skating

Competitive highlights 
CS: Challenger Series; JGP: Junior Grand Prix

Ice dance with Zhata

Ice dance with Kelly

Pairs with Demirsal

Ice dance with Demirsal

Single skating

References

External links 

 
 
 

Turkish male ice dancers
1995 births
Living people
Sportspeople from Bursa